Catamola is a genus of snout moths. It was erected by Edward Meyrick in 1884 and is known from Australia.

Species
 Catamola funerea (Walker, 1863)
 Catamola xanthomelalis (Walker, 1863)

References

Epipaschiinae
Pyralidae genera